Leen is a surname. Notable people with the surname include:

Bill Leen (born 1962), American musician
Nina Leen (died 1995), Russian-American photographer
Randy Leen (born 1975), American golfer
Willem van Leen (1753–1825), Dutch painter
Willie Joe Leen, Irish hurler

See also
Leen (given name)
Lean (disambiguation)